The Locust Creek Covered Bridge is the only remaining covered bridge in Pocahontas County, West Virginia. It is located approximately  outside Hillsboro. The bridge is now for pedestrian traffic only.

History 
R. N. Bruce was contracted in 1870 to build the wooden covered bridge for US$1,250. The Warren Double Intersection truss covered bridge was completed later that year.

In 1888, the original bridge was burned and replaced. In 1904 it was rebuilt again by W. M. Irvine. Interior supports, trusses, side paneling and roof were replaced during the reconstruction. In 1968, the bridge was painted and new oak floor was installed. Temporary supports used during the floor replacement were left in place.

The bridge was added to the National Register of Historic Places in 1981

In 1990, the state of West Virginia bypassed the covered bridge with a modern concrete span.

In 2002, the covered bridge was renovated into a pedestrian crossing and the temporary supports were removed.

See also
List of West Virginia covered bridges

References

External links 
Locust Creek Covered Bridge at Bridges and Tunnels
Remaining Covered Bridges In WV

Covered bridges on the National Register of Historic Places in West Virginia
Bridges completed in 1870
Buildings and structures in Pocahontas County, West Virginia
Wooden bridges in West Virginia
Transportation in Pocahontas County, West Virginia
Tourist attractions in Pocahontas County, West Virginia
Pedestrian bridges in West Virginia
Former road bridges in the United States
National Register of Historic Places in Pocahontas County, West Virginia
Road bridges on the National Register of Historic Places in West Virginia
Warren truss bridges in the United States